The Ciney is a Belgian beer native to town of Ciney.

Ciney is brewed in the brewery Alken-Maes.

See also

 the town of Ciney

References
  Official website of the town of Ciney

Belgian beer brands
Beer brands
Belgian brands
Ciney